The 2009–10 Lehigh Mountain Hawks men's basketball team represented Lehigh University during the 2009–10 NCAA Division I men's basketball season. The Mountain Hawks, led by third-year head coach Brett Reed, played their home games at Stabler Arena and were members of the Patriot League. They finished the season 22–11, 10–4 in Patriot League play to finish in first place in the conference.

Following the regular season, Lehigh won the Patriot League Basketball tournament to earn the conference's automatic bid into the 2010 NCAA tournament. This was their fourth NCAA Tournament appearance with their previous trip coming in 2004. As the No. 16 seed in the Midwest region, they fell to No. 1 seed Kansas in the Round of 64.

Roster 

Source

Schedule and results

|-
!colspan=9 style=| Non-conference regular season

|-
!colspan=9 style=| Patriot League regular season

|-
!colspan=9 style=| 2010 Patriot League tournament

|-
!colspan=9 style=| 2010 NCAA tournament

,

Awards and honors
CJ McCollum – Patriot League Player of the Year, Patriot League Newcomer of the Year

References

Lehigh Mountain Hawks men's basketball seasons
Lehigh
Lehigh